Amata is a genus of tiger moths in the family Erebidae. The genus was erected by Johan Christian Fabricius in 1807.

Selected species

 Amata albapex Hampson, 1893
 Amata albionica Dufay, 1965
 Amata albobasis Kiriakoff, 1954
 Amata alenicola (Strand, 1912)
 Amata alicia (Butler, 1876)
 Amata annulata Fabricius, 1775
 Amata antitheta Meyrick, 1886
 Amata aperta Walker, 1865
 Amata atricornis (Wallengren, 1863)
 Amata atricornuta Gaede, 1926
 Amata attenuata Rothschild, 1910
 Amata basithyris Hampson, 1914
 Amata benitonis (Strand, 1912)
 Amata bicincta Kollar, 1844
 Amata bicolor Walker, 1854
 Amata bifasciata (Hopffer, 1857)
 Amata bondo (Kiriakoff, 1965)
 Amata borguensis (Hampson, 1901)
 Amata borneogena Obraztsov, 1955
 Amata burtti (Distant, 1900)
 Amata caerulescens (Druce, 1898)
 Amata cantori Moore, 1859
 Amata caspia Staudinger, 1877
 Amata cerbera (Linnaeus, 1764)
 Amata ceres (Oberthür, 1878)
 Amata chariessa (Jordan, 1936)
 Amata chloroscia (Hampson, 1901)
 Amata cholmlei (Hampson, 1907)
 Amata chlorometis Meyrick, 1886
 Amata choneutospila Turner, 1905
 Amata chroma Swinhoe, 1892
 Amata chromatica Turner, 1905
 Amata chrysozona (Hampson, 1898)
 Amata congener (Hampson, 1901)
 Amata consimilis (Hampson, 1901)
 Amata creobota (Holland, 1893)
 Amata croceizona (Hampson, 1910)
 Amata cuprizonata (Hampson, 1901)
 Amata cyanea Hampson, 1914
 Amata cyanura Meyrick, 1886
 Amata cyssea Stoll, 1782
 Amata decorata Walker, 1862
 Amata dilatata Snellen, 1881
 Amata dilateralis (Hampson, 1898)
 Amata discata (Druce, 1898)
 Amata dissimilis (Bethune-Baker, 1911)
 Amata distorta (Rothschild, 1910)
 Amata divalis (Schaus & Clements, 1893)
 Amata dohertyi (Hampson, 1898)
 Amata dyschlaena Turner, 1905
 Amata elongimacula Hampson, 1898
 Amata endocrocis (Hampson, 1903)
 Amata exapta Swinhow, 1892
 Amata expandens Walker, 1862
 Amata flavoanalis (Seitz, 1926)
 Amata fortunei (d'Orza, 1869) – white-spotted moth
 Amata francisca (Butler, 1876)
 Amata fruhstorferi (Hampson, 1898)
 Amata gigas (Rothschild, 1910)
 Amata gil Witt et al., 2007
 Amata goodii (Holland, 1893)
 Amata hellei (Romieux, 1935)
 Amata hemiphoenica (Hampson, 1910)
 Amata heptaspila Turner, 1905
 Amata hesperitis Meyrick, 1886
 Amata huebneri Boisduval, 1828
 Amata humeralis Butler, 1876
 Amata hyalota Meyrick, 1886
 Amata hypomela Kiriakoff, 1954
 Amata insularis Butler, 1876
 Amata interniplaga (Mabille, 1890)
 Amata jacksoni Rothschild, 1910
 Amata janenschi Seitz, 1926
 Amata johanna (Butler, 1876)
 Amata kenredi (Rothschild, 1910)
 Amata kinensis Hampson, 1898
 Amata kruegeri Ragusa, 1904
 Amata kuhlweini (Lefèbvre, 1832)
 Amata lagosensis (Hampson, 1907)
 Amata lampetis Turner, 1898
 Amata lateralis (Boisduval, 1836)
 Amata leimacis (Holland, 1893)
 Amata leucacma Meyrick, 1886
 Amata leucerythra (Holland, 1893)
 Amata leucosoma (Butler, 1876)
 Amata lucta Lucas, 1901
 Amata luzonensis (Wileman & West, 1925)
 Amata macroflavifer Holloway, 1988
 Amata macroplaca Meyrick, 1886
 Amata magistri Turner, 1905
 Amata magnopupillata Berio, 1941
 Amata magrettii Berio, 1937
 Amata marella Butler, 1876
 Amata marina (Butler, 1876)
 Amata marinoides Kiriakoff, 1954
 Amata marjana Stauder, 1913
 Amata melitospila Turner, 1905
 Amata mestralii Bugnion, 1837
 Amata miozona (Hampson, 1910)
 Amata mjobergi Talbot, 1926
 Amata mogadorensis Blachier, 1908
 Amata monothyris Hampson, 1914
 Amata monticola (Aurivillius, 1910)
 Amata multicincta (Hampson, 1914)
 Amata multifasciata (Hampson, [1893])
 Amata nigriceps Butler, 1876
 Amata nigricilia (Strand, 1912)
 Amata nigricornis Alphéraky, 1883
 Amata nigrobasalis Rothschild, 1910
 Amata ntebi (Bethune-Baker, 1911)
 Amata obraztsovi Kiriakoff, 1954
 Amata ochrospila Turner, 1922
 Amata olinda Swinhoe, 1892
 Amata orphnaea Turner, 1898
 Amata pactolina Walker, 1865
 Amata paradelpha Turner, 1905
 Amata paraula Meyrick, 1886
 Amata passalis (Fabricius, 1781) 
 Amata pembertoni Rothschild, 1910
 Amata perixanthia (Hampson, 1898)
 Amata pfeifferae (Moore, 1859)
 Amata phaeobasis (Hampson, 1907)
 Amata phaeochyta Turner, 1907
 Amata phaeososma Hampson, 1914
 Amata phaeozona (Zerny, 1912)
 Amata phegea Linnaeus, 1758 – nine-spotted moth 
 Amata phepsalotis Meyrick, 1886
 Amata phoenicia (Hampson, 1898)
 Amata pleurosticta (Hampson, 1898)
 Amata ploetzi (Strand, 1912)
 Amata polidamon (Cramer, 1779)
 Amata polymita Linnaeus, 1768 – tiger-striped clearwing moth
 Amata polyxo (Fawcett, 1918)
 Amata prepuncta Holloway, 1988
 Amata prosomoea Turner, 1905
 Amata pryeri Hampson, 1898
 Amata pseudextensa Rothschild, 1910
 Amata pseudosimplex de Freina, 2013
 Amata pyrocoma Meyrick, 1886
 Amata ragazzii Turati, 1917
 Amata recedens Lucas, 1891
 Amata rendalli (Distant, 1897)
 Amata romeii Berio, 1941
 Amata rubritincta (Hampson, 1903)
 Amata rufina (Oberthür, 1878)
 Amata schoutedeni Kiriakoff, 1954
 Amata shirakii (Sonan, 1941)
 Amata shoa (Hampson, 1898)
 Amata similis (Le Cerf, 1922)
 Amata simplex (Walker, 1854)
 Amata soror (Le Cerf, 1922)
 Amata sperbius (Fabricius, 1787)
 Amata stanleyi (Kiriakoff, 1965)
 Amata stenoptera (Zerny, 1912)
 Amata stictoptera Rothschild, 1910
 Amata symphona Swinhoe, 1907
 Amata syntomoides Butler, 1876
 Amata teinopera Hampson, 1898
 Amata tenera Hulstaert, 1923
 Amata tetragonaria Walker, 1862
 Amata thoracica Moore, 1877
 Amata tomasina (Butler, 1876)
 Amata trifascia Holloway, 1976
 Amata trigonophora Turner, 1898
 Amata tripunctata (Bethune-Baker, 1911)
 Amata tritonia (Hampson, 1911)
 Amata uelleburgensis (Strand, 1912)
 Amata velatipennis (Walker, 1864)
 Amata vicarians Holloway, 1988
 Amata waldowi (Grünberg, 1907)
 Amata wallacei (Moore, 1859)
 Amata williami Rothschild, 1910
 Amata xanthopleura Hampson, 1914
 Amata xanthosoma Turner, 1898
 Amata xanthura Turner, 1905

Gallery

References

 
Syntomini
Moth genera
Taxa named by Johan Christian Fabricius